Gutter Rainbows is the fourth studio album by American hip hop artist Talib Kweli. The album was released on January 25, 2011, by Blacksmith Music and Javotti Media. The album was originally intended to be released in only a digital format. However, on November 16, 2010, it was announced that Duck Down Records would step in to see the album got a CD release. This included an import edition and a special edition with extras.

Reception

Critical response

Gutter Rainbows was met with generally positive reviews from music critics. The album holds a score of 71 out of 100 from Metacritic based on "generally favorable reviews". HipHopDX gave it a score of three out of five and called it "a fairly easy spin, and can go into the listener's steady rotation in a pinch. That being said, this feels a bit like a subdued version of Eardrum." BBC Music gave it a favorable review and said, "This is an odd thing to say, given the dumbness of so many contemporary rap songs--is that Kweli tries to cram too much awareness into his lines at the expense of rhymes and flow. But trying a little too hard to find enlightenment can be forgiven when it comes from within a genre that often tips bravado ahead of insight." However, some reviews are very average or mixed: URB gave it three stars out of five and said, "Talib seems to be coasting just a bit on this cut-and-paste session. As in, from a pure musical standpoint, outside of a few of repeat-worthy tracks, Gutter Rainbows is no cure for your current cabin fever." No Ripcord gave it a score of six stars out of ten and said that it "hovers between a mainstream and an indie vibe, embracing neither and potentially isolating both audiences." Tiny Mix Tapes gave it a score of two stars out of five and said, "Kweli still has an ear for beats, and despite some particular low points here, his lyrics were always overshadowed by his flow, which is as sharp as ever."

Commercial performance
In its first week, the album sold 13,900 copies in the United States. In the first two weeks after its release, the album sold a total of 19,000 copies in the United States.

Track listing

Personnel
Credits for Gutter Rainbows adapted from CD booklet.

Richard Andrew — vocals
Steve Baughman — mixing
Christoph Bauss — producer
Maurice Brown — producer, trumpet
Marco Bruno — producer
Kevin Calloway — session coordinator
Luis Cato — bass
Jarriel Carter — horn arrangements
John Cave — guitar
Brian Cockerham — bass
Adam Deitch — drums
Jon Dixon — synthesizer
Raymond Angry — keyboard
Nate Jones — bass 
Drew Friedman — executive producer
Michael Geldreich — piano
Mike Gibney — mixing
Talib Greene — vocals, executive producer
Larry Griffin — producer, horn arrangements
Nigel Hall — vocals, piano
Tsidi Ibrahim — vocals, additional vocals
Borahm Lee — keyboard
Michael Jackson — producer
Aaron Johnson — vocals
Daru Jones — drums
Eric Jones — producer

Michael Kawesch — producer
Chris Koltay — engineer
Eric Krasno — guitar
Mark Landon — producer
Alby Cohen - Recording Engineer on Tracks, 1-3, 5-9, 13-14
Mike L. LaValle — bass, guitar
Rob Mandell — instrumentation
Patrick Mathore — producer
Caleb McCampbell — co-producer, additional producer, additional keys
Aaron Merkin — vocals
Joe Nardone — mixing
Winston Nelson — rhodes, flute
Charles Njapa — producer, additional vocals
Sean Price — vocals
Anthony Ransom — producer, vocals, publishing
Kendra Ross — vocals
Christopher Tyson — producer
Maurizio Sera — mixing
Liu Sing — publishing
Nicholas Speed — producer, programming
Brady Watt — bass
Tony Williams — vocals
David Willis — producer
Mike Wyatt — engineer
Harrison Young — piano
James Roberts — additional vocals

Charts

References

External links

2011 albums
Talib Kweli albums
Duck Down Music albums
Albums produced by Marco Polo
Albums produced by Ski Beatz
Albums produced by Khrysis
Albums produced by Oh No (musician)
Albums produced by Nick Speed
Albums produced by Symbolyc One
Albums produced by 88-Keys